Diaxenes taylori is a species of beetle in the family Cerambycidae. It was described by C. Waterhouse.

References

Apomecynini